Rhynchospora riedeliana is a member of the sedge family, Cyperaceae. It is a perennial herb, native to the state of Minas Gerais in Brazil.

References

External links

riedeliana
Flora of Minas Gerais
Plants described in 1908